The Aura is a 2005 neo-noir psychological thriller film written and directed by Fabián Bielinsky and starring Ricardo Darín, Dolores Fonzi, Pablo Cedrón and Nahuel Pérez Biscayart. It was Bielinsky's second and final feature film before his death in 2006. The plot revolves around an epileptic taxidermist who often fantasizes about committing the perfect heist, and who suddenly has the chance of making one happen after he accidentally kills a man who was in fact a career criminal.

The Aura received mostly positive reviews from critics upon its release, particularly for its screenplay and ambience. It won the Silver Condor for Best Film and was the Argentine entry for the Best Foreign Language Film at the 78th Academy Awards.

Plot synopsis
In neo-noir fashion El Aura narrates the hallucinating voyage of Espinoza, a quiet, cynical taxidermist, who suffers epilepsy attacks, and is obsessed with committing the perfect crime. He claims that the cops are too stupid to find out about it when it's well executed, and that the robbers are too stupid to execute it the right way; and that he could do it himself relying on his photographic memory and his strategic planning skills.

On his first ever hunting trip, in the calm of the Patagonian forest, Espinoza accidentally kills a man who turns out to be a real criminal, and he "inherits" his latest scheme: the heist of an armored truck carrying casino profits. Moved by morbid curiosity, and later by an inexorable flow of events, the taxidermist discovers the price it takes for his dream to come true, all the while and piece by piece completing a puzzle irremediably encircling him. And he does it while struggling with his greatest weakness: epilepsy. Before each seizure he is visited by the "aura": a paradoxical moment of confusion and enlightenment where the past and future seem to blend.

Cast

Release
The film opened wide in Argentina on September 15, 2005. Later in the month it was presented at the Rio de Janeiro International Film Festival on September 30, 2005.
It was theatrically released in Spain on 21 October 2005, whereas it opened in French theatres on 29 March 2006.

The picture was screened at various film festivals, including: the  Sundance Film Festival, United States; the Toulouse Latin America Film Festival, France; the Alba Regia International Film Festival, Hungary; the Transilvania International Film Festival, Romania; the Film by the Sea Film Festival, Netherlands; the Helsinki International Film Festival, Finland; and others.

Reception

Critical response
El Aura garnered mostly positive reviews from film critics. On review aggregate website Rotten Tomatoes, the film holds an overall 87% "Certified Fresh" approval rating based on 45 reviews, with a rating average of 7.5 out of 10. The site's consensus is: "The Aura is a highly original and cerebral thriller that maintains its suspense from start to finish." At Metacritic, which assigns a weighted mean rating out of 0–100 reviews from film critics, the film has a rating score of 78 based on 19 reviews, classified as a generally favorably reviewed film.

Critic A.O. Scott, who writes for The New York Times, liked the way director Fabián Bielinsky used the neo-noir style, writing, "Mr. Bielinsky made use of a familiar film noir vocabulary, but not for the usual young-filmmaker-in-a-hurry purpose of showing off his facility with genre tricks. Rather, his movies restore some of the clammy, anxious atmosphere that made the old noirs so powerful to begin with."  He also mentions the early death of director Bielinsky.  He said, "For his part, Mr. Bielinsky, in what would sadly be his last film, demonstrates a mastery of the form that is downright scary."

Film critic Jonathan Holland, film critic for Variety magazine, liked the film and wrote, "An engrossing existential thriller from Fabien Bielinsky...Leisurely paced, studied, reticent and rural, The Aura is a quieter, richer and better-looking piece that handles its multiple manipulations with the maturity the earlier pic sometimes lacked...Featuring a career-best perf from Ricardo Darin, pic is a must-see in territories that warmed to Queens, while its superior production values could generate even bigger returns from international arthouse auds who enjoy their thrillers with a touch of distinction."

Film critic David Wiegand thought that director Bielinsky tackled a bit too much in this film and wrote, "Bielinsky's latest film, The Aura, is in some ways more ambitious, which may be one of the reasons it doesn't work as well as it should...the careful camera work, beautifully dark cinematography and the quietly nuanced performance by Darín keep our attention, but in the end, the film's bigger challenge isn't its length, or its deliberate pace: It's that it's overly freighted with symbolism and meaning."

Awards
Wins
 Cartagena Film Festival, Colombia: Best Director, Fabián Bielinsky; 2005.
 Clarin Awards: Clarin Award, Best Cinematography, Checco Varese; 2005.
 Havana Film Festival: FIPRESCI Prize, Best Film, Fabián Bielinsky; 2005.
 Argentine Film Critics Association Awards: Silver Condor; Best Actor, Ricardo Darín; Best Cinematography, Checco Varese; Best Director, Fabián Bielinsky; Best Film; Best Original Screenplay, Fabián Bielinsky; Best Sound, Carlos Abbate and José Luis Díaz; 2006.

Nominations
 San Sebastián International Film Festival: Golden Seashell, Fabián Bielinsky; 2005.
 Argentine Film Critics Association Awards: Silver Condor, Best Art Direction, Mercedes Alfonsín; Best Editing, Alejandro Carrillo Penovi and Fernando Pardo; Best Music, Lucio Godoy; Best Supporting Actor, Pablo Cedrón; 2006.

See also 
 List of Argentine films of 2005
 List of Spanish films of 2005
 List of French films of 2006

References

External links
 
 
 
 
 
 
 
 The Aura at The Numbers

2005 films
2005 psychological thriller films
French psychological thriller films
Argentine independent films
Neo-noir
Spanish psychological thriller films
2000s Spanish-language films
Films shot in Buenos Aires
Films set in Buenos Aires
Films distributed by Disney
Argentine psychological thriller films
2000s Argentine films
2000s Spanish films
2000s French films
Tornasol Films films